Newcastle on Clun is a civil parish in Shropshire, England.  It contains 28 listed buildings that are recorded in the National Heritage List for England.  Of these, two are at Grade II*, the middle of the three grades, and the others are at Grade II, the lowest grade.  The parish contains the village of Newcastle, part of the village of Whitcott Keysett, and the surrounding countryside.  Most of the listed buildings are farmhouses, farm buildings, houses, and cottages, the earliest of which are timber framed.  The other listed buildings are a church, a memorial in the churchyard, a lych gate, an inscribed stone and a cross, and a watermill.
 

Key

Buildings

References

Citations

Sources

Lists of buildings and structures in Shropshire